Richard Cameron (born 16 June 1948) is an English playwright from Doncaster . His themes are Northern post-industrial society, working class life, tough women and violent men.  Cameron's plays include Pond Life (1992), Not Fade Away (1993), The Mortal Ash (1994), Almost Grown (1994), All of You Mine (1996), The Glee Club (2002), Gong Donkeys (2004), Flower Girls (2007), and Can't Stand Up For Falling Down.

Cameron wrote Dear Nobody starring Sean Maguire, and Stone, Scissors, Paper for BBC (1997).  He has also contributed to the popular TV series Midsomer Murders, writing the script for the episode "Midsomer Rhapsody".

References

External links
Profile at Curtis Brown agency
Plays, Vol.1 ((Methuen Contemporary Dramatists))
Interview in What's On South West
The Glee Club - review in guardian.co.uk

People from Doncaster
1938 births
Living people
English male dramatists and playwrights